Kaleh-ye San (also Romanized as Kaleh-ye Sān) is a village in Jalalvand Rural District, Firuzabad District, Kermanshah County, Kermanshah Province, Iran. At the 2006 census, its population was 160, in 39 families.

References 

Populated places in Kermanshah County